Mount Warlow is a 13,206-foot-elevation (4,025 meter) mountain summit located  west of the crest of the Sierra Nevada mountain range, in Fresno County of northern California, United States. Mount Warlow ranks as the 108th highest summit in California. The approach to this remote peak is made via the John Muir Trail.

History
The mountain is named after Chester H. Warlow (1889–1963), attorney, Fresno civic leader, and conservationist, who was instrumental in the creation of Kings Canyon National Park. Each year from 1913 through 1930 he used his 30-day vacations to visit the High Sierras between Yosemite and Mount Whitney. He was California Highway Commissioner from 1943 through 1961, and also has a highway rest area near Kingsburg named after him. The mountain's name was officially adopted in 1969 by the United States Board on Geographic Names. The first ascent of the summit was made in 1926 by Nathaniel Goodrich and Marjory Hurd.

Climate
According to the Köppen climate classification system, Mount Warlow is located in an alpine climate zone. Most weather fronts originate in the Pacific Ocean, and travel east toward the Sierra Nevada mountains. As fronts approach, they are forced upward by the peaks, causing them to drop their moisture in the form of rain or snowfall onto the range (orographic lift). This climate until recently supported the Mount Warlow Glacier in the northwest cirque. Precipitation runoff from this mountain drains southeast into headwaters of the Middle Fork Kings River, or northwest into Evolution Creek which is a San Joaquin River tributary.

Gallery

See also
 List of the major 4000-meter summits of California

References

External links

 Weather forecast: Mount Warlow
 Aerial photo of east aspect: Flickr

Mountains of Fresno County, California
Mountains of Kings Canyon National Park
North American 4000 m summits
Mountains of Northern California
Sierra Nevada (United States)